Stewart Douglas Wieck (May 10, 1968  June 22, 2017) was one of the founders of the publishing company, White Wolf, Inc. He was also one of the original writers of Mage: The Ascension.

Career
Stewart Wieck was born in Freeport, Illinois in 1968. He and his brother Steve Wieck had their first published work in 1986 with the adventure The Secret in the Swamp for Villains & Vigilantes from FGU. Later that same year, while they were still in high school, the brothers began self-publishing their own magazine, Arcanum; Stewart soon retitled the magazine as White Wolf, publishing the first issue in August 1986. The Wiecks were fans of Elric, and named their magazine after him.

The Wiecks had befriended the company Lion Rampant, and when that company encountered financial trouble, White Wolf and Lion Rampant decided to merge into the new White Wolf Game Studio, with Stewart Wieck and Mark Rein-Hagen as co-owners. While Stewart was on the road to GenCon 23 in 1990 with Rein-Hagen and Lisa Stevens, Rein-Hagen envisioned Vampire: The Masquerade, which the new company published in 1991. Stewart co-created the World of Darkness and devised much of the mythology central to Vampire, but his most personal game design was Mage: The Ascension (1993).

With Rein-Hagen working on White Wolf's games, administering the business side of things fell to Stewart Wieck until he made his brother Steve the CEO of White Wolf in 1993. Stewart stepped down as editor of White Wolf Magazine in 1992. The company encountered economic problems in 1995–1996, which caused a falling out between Rein-Hagen and the Wiecks, resulting in Rein-Hagen leaving White Wolf. Stewart designed the game Long Live the King (2006).

Stewart stayed with White Wolf when Steve left in 2007 to take a seat on CCP's board of directors. Stewart resigned from White Wolf in 2010, immediately founding the company Nocturnal Games, which picked up White Wolf's rights to Pendragon. He co-designed the fantasy board game Darkling Plain, which uses 3D graphics created on smartphones. It was announced in 2013 by Nocturnal Media.

He co-edited the 1998 book The Essential World of Darkness, a collection of novels. Wieck is also an author of several novels and a number of short stories.

Wieck died June 22, 2017 at the age of 49.

References

1968 births
2017 deaths
Mage: The Ascension
People from Freeport, Illinois
Role-playing game designers
White Wolf game designers